The tree species Sorbus americana is commonly known as the American mountain-ash. It is a deciduous perennial tree, native to eastern North America.

The American mountain-ash and related species (most often the European mountain-ash, Sorbus aucuparia) are also referred to as rowan trees.

Description 
Sorbus americana is a relatively small tree, reaching  in height. The American mountain-ash attains its largest specimens on the northern shores of Lake Huron and Lake Superior.

It resembles the European mountain-ash, Sorbus aucuparia.

 Bark Light gray, smooth, surface scaly. Branchlets downy at first, later become smooth, brown tinged with red, lenticular, finally they become darker and the papery outer layer becomes easily separable.
 Wood Pale brown; light, soft, close-grained but weak. Specific gravity, 0.5451; weight of cu. ft., 33.97 lbs.
 Winter budsDark red, acute, one-fourth to three-quarters of an inch long. Inner scales are very tomentose and enlarge with the growing shoot.
Leaflets 13 to 17, lanceolate or long oval, two to three inches long, one-half to two-thirds broad, unequally wedge-shaped or rounded at base, serrate, acuminate, sessile, the terminal one sometimes borne on a stalk half an inch long, feather-veined, midrib prominent beneath, grooved above. They come out of the bud downy, conduplicate; when full grown are smooth, dark yellow green above and paler beneath. In autumn they turn a clear yellow. Stipules leaf-like, caducous.
 FlowersMay, June, after the leaves are full grown. Perfect, white, one-eighth of an inch across, borne in flat compound cymes three or four inches across. Bracts and bractlets acute, minute, caducous.
 Calyx Urn-shaped, hairy, five-lobed; lobes, short, acute, imbricate in bud.
 Corolla Petals five, creamy white, orbicular, contracted into short claws, inserted on calyx, imbricate in bud.
 Stamens Twenty to thirty, inserted on calyx tube; filaments thread-like; anthers introrse, two-celled; cells opening longitudinally.
 Pistil Two to three carpels inserted in the bottom of the calyx tube and united into an inferior ovary. Styles two to three; stigmas capitate; ovules two in each cell.
 Fruit Berry-like pome, globular, one-quarter of an inch across, bright red, borne in cymous clusters. Ripens in October and remains on the tree all winter. Flesh thin and sour, charged with malic acid; seeds light brown, oblong, compressed; cotyledons fleshy.

Distribution 
Native to eastern North America;
Eastern Canada – New Brunswick, Newfoundland, Nova Scotia, Ontario, Prince Edward Island, Quebec
Northeastern United States – Connecticut, Maine, Massachusetts, New Hampshire, New Jersey, New York, Pennsylvania, Vermont
North-Central United States – Illinois [n. (Ogle Co.)], Michigan, Minnesota, Wisconsin. Listed as endangered by the State of Illinois
Southeastern United States – Appalachian Mountains, Georgia, Maryland, North Carolina, Tennessee, Virginia, West Virginia

Biota 
The berries of American mountain-ash are eaten by numerous species of birds, including ruffed grouse, ptarmigans, sharp-tailed grouse, blue grouse, American robins, other thrushes, waxwings, jays, and small mammals, such as squirrels and rodents.

American mountain-ash is a preferred browse for moose and white-tailed deer. Moose will eat foliage, twigs, and bark. Up to 80 percent of American mountain-ash stems were browsed by moose in control plots adjacent to exclosures on Isle Royale. Fishers, martens, snowshoe hares, and ruffed grouse also browse American mountain-ash.

Cultivation 
Sorbus americana is cultivated as an ornamental tree, for use in gardens and parks. It prefers a rich moist soil and the borders of swamps, but will flourish on rocky hillsides.

A cultivar is the red cascade mountain-ash, or Sorbus americana 'Dwarfcrown'. It is planted in gardens, and as a street tree.

Uses 
After their first winter freeze, the fruits are edible raw or cooked. They can be used to make pie and jelly.

References

External links 

 
 Sorbus americana – picture of young tree, and complete summary data
 Interactive Distribution Map for Sorbus americana

americana
Edible fruits
Garden plants of North America
Ornamental trees
Trees of the United States
Trees of Canada